Smithfield West is a locality situated in western Sydney, New South Wales, Australia. Part of Smithfield, it is an unofficial designation for the region, or neighbourhood area, westwards from Dublin Street to Wetherill Street on the boundary of Wetherill Park.

History
In 1867, Smithfield was a semi-rural settlement populated by vine growers, gardeners, wood timber cutters, orchards and tanneries. Some of the best farming land at that time was in the district to the west and southwest of the Smithfield area, which includes the locality of Smithfield West.

Designation
Websites such as Weatherzone and Australia Post, among others, feature the locality of Smithfield West in their database, which shares the same postcode of Smithfield (2164).

Commercial area
The locality of Smithfield West has small pockets of restaurants in Dublin Street near Brenan Street, and as well as in Hassall Street, which have included Chinese restaurants, a gelato bar, a prominent Italian restaurant, a fish and chips eatery, a delicatessen market, a drug store, a doctor's office, a bakery, a newsagent's shop, and a few convenient shopfronts. 

There is also a 7-Eleven located in Polding Street.

Culture
Smithfield Cemetery is situated in this locality, on Dublin Street, corner of Victoria Road. Smithfield West Public School, which includes a preschool, is located on Wetherill Street, bordering Wetherill Park. The locality lies in the Electoral district of Prospect and the Division of McMahon, as with Smithfield.

Geography
The Horsley Drive is the major road which runs through the locality. Other major roads include Polding Street, Hassal Street and Victoria Street, with the latter featuring factories. Bus services are provided by Transit Systems Sydney. The buse 806, which goes through the locality links to Fairfield railway station, Parramatta railway station and Liverpool railway station. There is a cycle way that runs through the locality, which is part of the Western Sydney Regional Park recreational route.

Rosford Street Reserve is a parkland in the northern skirts of the locality which features a large sports grounds and an urban forest.

References

External links
Smithfield West Public School
Smithfield West on Weatherzone
The locality on Wikimapia
 

City of Fairfield
Sydney localities
Populated places established in 1836
1836 establishments in Australia